Nordkjosbotn Church is a chapel of the Church of Norway in Balsfjord Municipality in Troms og Finnmark county, Norway. It is located in the village of Nordkjosbotn. It is one of the churches for the Balsfjord parish which is part of the Senja prosti (deanery) in the Diocese of Nord-Hålogaland. The white, wood and aggregate concrete church was built in a long church style in 1987 using plans drawn up by the architect Åge Pedersen. The church seats about 260 people.

See also
List of churches in Nord-Hålogaland

References

Balsfjord
Churches in Troms
20th-century Church of Norway church buildings
Churches completed in 1987
1987 establishments in Norway
Long churches in Norway
Concrete churches in Norway